Oscar Josef Alin (22 December 184631 December 1900) was a Swedish historian and politician.

Life
Alin was born in Falun, Sweden. In 1872 he completed his doctorate and became docent of political science, and in 1882 professor skytteanus of Government and Eloquence at Uppsala University. As professor skytteanus he succeeded Vilhelm Erik Svedelius, whom he also followed in the inspectorship of the university's Västmanland-Dalarna Nation. In September 1888 he was elected a member of the first chamber of the Riksdag, where he attached himself to the conservative protectionist party, over which, from the first, he exercised great authority. He retired from the Riksdag in 1899 to become rector magnificus of the university, but died already at the end of the next year. It is as a historian that Alin is most remarkable.

Works
Among his numerous works the following are especially worthy of note: 
Bidrag till svenska rådets historia under medeltiden (Upsala 1872);
 Sveriges historia, 1511-1611 (Stockholm, 1878);
 Bidrag till svenska statskickets historia (Stockholm, 1884–1887);
 Den svensk-norsk unionen (Stockholm, 1889–1891), the best book on the Norwego-Swedish Union question from the Swedish point of view;
 Fjerde artiklen af fredstraktaten i Kiel (Stockholm, 1899);
 Carl Johan och Sveriges yttre politik, 1810-1815 (Stockholm, 1899);
 Carl XIV Johan och rikets ständer, 1840-1841 (Stockholm, 1893).

He also edited Svenska riksdagsakter, 1521–1554 (Stockholm, 1887), in conjunction with Emil Hildebrand, and Sveriges grundlagar (Stockholm, 1892).

References

External links

19th-century Swedish historians
Academic staff of Uppsala University
1846 births
1900 deaths
People from Falun
Members of the Riksdag
19th-century Swedish politicians
Members of the Royal Society of Sciences in Uppsala